La Grande Vie may refer to:

La Grande Vie (film), German-French-Italian 1960 co-production, directed by Julien Duvivier and starring Giulietta Masina
La Grande Vie (novella), two 1986 juvenile literature works by French author J. M. G. Le Clézio, published by Gallimard Jeunesse

See also
High life (disambiguation)
The High Life (disambiguation)